Bishop Thornton is a village in the civil parish of Bishop Thornton, Shaw Mills and Warsill, in the Harrogate district of North Yorkshire, England.  According to the 2001 census it had a population of 521, decreasing to 507 at the 2011 census. The village is about seven miles north of Harrogate.

Bishop Thornton has both Anglican and Roman Catholic churches, the latter being the oldest in the Diocese of Leeds, and two schools.

The village was historically part of the West Riding of Yorkshire until 1974.

References

External links

Villages in North Yorkshire
Borough of Harrogate